Flight 409 may refer to:
United Airlines Flight 409, crashed on 6 October 1955
Ethiopian Airlines Flight 409, crashed on 25 January 2010
Summit Air Flight 409, crashed on 27 May 2017

0409